Lee Yuan-tsu (24 September 1923  — 8 March 2017), was a Kuomintang politician who served under Lee Teng-hui as the eighth Vice President of the Republic of China. He was of Hakka ancestry.

Early life
His family was Hakka had origin in Meixian, Guangdong. But he was born in Pingjiang, Hunan

Lee obtained his bachelor's degree in law and politics from National Chengchi University in Nanjing in 1946. He retreated to Taiwan from Mainland China in 1949 after the end of Chinese Civil War with the National Revolutionary Army. He obtained his doctoral degree from University of Bonn in Germany in 1963.

Political career
Lee entered politics in 1969 when he became a legal consultant for the Ministry of National Defense. He served as Minister of Education from 1974 to 1978, then Minister of Justice until 1984 and Secretary-General to the President between 1988 and 1990.

He was nominated by Lee Teng-hui to be the Vice President of the Republic of China after the death of President Chiang Ching-kuo in 1988. In 1989, President Lee stated that his vice president must be a Mainland Chinese. Eventually Lee Yuan-tsu was elected as the Vice President by the National Assembly on 21 March 1990, becoming the last vice president to be elected by the National Assembly before the introduction of direct presidential and vice presidential elections in Taiwan afterwards. He took office on 20 May 1990 serving until 19 May 1996.

Retirement
After retiring from politics in 1996, Lee resumed his teaching position at National Chengchi University. His wife died in 1998. Eventually, he moved to Toufen in Miaoli County, where he lived a low-profile life.

Death

In his later life, Lee started to develop kidney problems which he treated with dialysis. Weeks before his death, Lee had stopped eating and depended on nutritional injection only. He told his medical team that he wished to die with dignity and rejected resuscitation. Lee died of kidney failure at 4:15 a.m. on 8 March 2017, aged 93, in his home in Miaoli County.

References

Vice presidents of the Republic of China on Taiwan
2017 deaths
1923 births
Politicians from Yueyang
Kuomintang politicians in Taiwan
Republic of China politicians from Hunan
Taiwanese Ministers of Justice
Senior Advisors to President Lee Teng-hui
Senior Advisors to President Chen Shui-bian
Senior Advisors to President Ma Ying-jeou
Taiwanese politicians of Hakka descent
Taiwanese people from Hunan
National Chengchi University alumni
Academic staff of the National Chengchi University
University of Bonn alumni
Taiwanese Ministers of Education
Deaths from kidney failure
Taiwanese expatriates in Germany
Chinese emigrants to Taiwan